Three Japanese destroyers have been named Akizuki:

 , an  launched in 1941 and sunk in 1944
 , an  launched in 1959 and stricken in 1993
 , an  launched in 2010

Japan Maritime Self-Defense Force ship names
Japanese Navy ship names